The Journal of Nietzsche Studies is a peer-reviewed academic journal devoted to the life, thought and writings of Friedrich Nietzsche. The journal is published three times a year by the Penn State University Press and has its editorial home at Hunter College, New York.

External links 
 
 The Journal of Nietzsche Studies on the Penn State Press website
 The Journal of Nietzsche Studies at Project MUSE

Hunter College
English-language journals
Penn State University Press academic journals
Biannual journals
Publications established in 1991
Nietzsche, Friedrich
Works about Friedrich Nietzsche
Triannual journals